Vasil Shopov (born 9 November 1991) is a Bulgarian footballer who currently plays as a midfielder for Spartak Pleven.

References

External links 

1991 births
Living people
Bulgarian footballers
PFC Spartak Pleven players
FK Bregalnica Štip players
PFC Litex Lovech players
FC Dunav Ruse players
Botev Plovdiv players
FC CSKA 1948 Sofia players
FC Tsarsko Selo Sofia players
First Professional Football League (Bulgaria) players
Association football midfielders
Bulgarian expatriates in North Macedonia
Sportspeople from Pleven